Notogomphus dorsalis is a species of dragonfly in the family Gomphidae. It is found in the Democratic Republic of the Congo, Ethiopia, Kenya, Tanzania, and Uganda. Its natural habitats are subtropical or tropical dry forests, subtropical or tropical moist lowland forests, and rivers.

References

Gomphidae
Taxonomy articles created by Polbot
Insects described in 1857